The 2016 Players' Championship was held from April 12 to 17 at the Mattamy Athletic Centre in Toronto, Ontario. It was the sixth men's and fifth women's Grand Slam of the 2015–16 World Curling Tour.

Newfoundland's Brad Gushue rink won their first men's title while Scotland's Eve Muirhead won her third women's title.

Men

Teams
The teams are listed as follows:

Round Robin Standings

Final Round Robin Standings

Round Robin Results

Draw 1
Tuesday, April 12, 7:00 pm

Draw 2
Wednesday, April 13, 8:30 am

Draw 3
Wednesday, April 13, 12:00 pm

Draw 4
Wednesday, April 13, 3:30 pm

Draw 5
Wednesday, April 13, 7:00 pm

Draw 6
Thursday, April 14, 8:30 am

Draw 7
Thursday, April 14, 12:00 pm

Draw 8
Thursday, April 14, 3:30 pm

Draw 9
Thursday, April 14, 7:00 pm

Draw 11
Friday, April 15, 12:00 pm

Draw 13
Friday, April 15, 7:00 pm

Tiebreaker
Saturday, April 16, 8:30 am

Playoffs

Quarterfinals
Saturday, April 16, 03:30 pm

Semifinals
Sunday, April 17, 10:00 am

Final
Sunday, April 17, 5:00 pm

Women

Teams
The teams are listed as follows:

Round Robin Standings
Final Round Robin Standings

Round Robin Results

Draw 1
Tuesday, April 12, 7:00 pm

Draw 2
Wednesday, April 13, 8:30 am

Draw 3
Wednesday, April 13, 12:00 pm

Draw 4
Wednesday, April 13, 3:30 pm

Draw 5
Wednesday, April 13, 7:00 pm

Draw 6
Thursday, April 14, 8:30 am

Draw 7
Thursday, April 14, 12:00 pm

Draw 8
Thursday, April 14, 3:30 pm

Draw 9
Thursday, April 14, 7:00 pm

Draw 10
Friday, April 15, 8:30 am

Draw 12
Friday, April 15, 3:30 pm

Playoffs

Quarterfinals
Saturday, April 16, 12:00 pm

Semifinals
Sunday, April 17, 10:00 am

Final
Sunday, April 17, 11:30 am

References

External links

Results- men's
Results- women's

Players' Championship
Players' Championship
Curling in Toronto
Sports competitions in Toronto
Players' Championship
April 2016 sports events in Canada